A by-election was held for the New South Wales Legislative Assembly electorate of West Sydney on 18 October 1865 because of the resignation of John Robertson due to financial difficulties.

Dates

Result

John Robertson resigned due to financial difficulties.

See also
 Electoral results for the district of West Sydney
List of New South Wales state by-elections

References

1865 elections in Australia
New South Wales state by-elections
1860s in New South Wales